

Elementary schools
The district's Elementary Schools are:
  George Long Elementary School  (Grades K-5)
  Grass Lake Middle School  (Grades 6-8)

Secondary schools
The district's Secondary Schools are:

  Grass Lake High School

Fine Arts

Theatre

The Grass Lake Community School's theatre department includes grades 2-12 within their productions.

See also
 List of school districts in Michigan

References

External links
 

School districts in Michigan
Education in Jackson County, Michigan
1952 establishments in Michigan